Alphonse Maeder (11 September 1882 – 27 January 1971) was a Swiss physician who specialised in psychiatry, psychotherapy, and psychoanalysis. He worked as an assistant to Eugen Bleuler and Carl Jung and worked with Sigmund Freud.

External links
Maeder, Alphonse E. (1882-1971) – International Dictionary of Psychoanalysis

Swiss psychiatrists
1882 births
1971 deaths